Ophiocordyceps sphecocephala is a species of parasitic fungus. It is entomopathogenic, meaning it grows within insects, particularly wasps of the genera Polistes, Tachytes, and Vespa. It has been reported across the Americas and China.

Physically, its stromata can be 2–10 cm long, and form an egg-shaped head. It is cream or yellow in color.

The fungus has possible implications in medicine; it may have anti-asthmatic or anti-cancer properties.

After the fungus takes over the insect, the insect would go to the highest place and the fungus would sprout out of the body.

This is a rare ingredient coveted by Chinese apothecaries and can be worth hundreds of dollars.

References 

Ophiocordycipitaceae
Fungi described in 1843